John Lanigan may refer to:

 John Lanigan (historian) (1758–1825), Irish Church historian
 John Lanigan (radio) (born 1943), American radio and TV personality
 John Lanigan (politician) (1803–1868), Irish politician
 John Lanigan (hurler) (1912–1988), Irish hurler
 John Lanigan (tenor) (1921–1996), Australian operatic tenor
 John J. Lanigan (1935–2014), American businessman and politician
 John R. Lanigan (1902–1974), United States Marine Corps general